Kazimierz Kaszewski (1825–1910) was a Polish educator.

1825 births
1910 deaths
Polish educators